{{Taxobox
| image = Trinchesia-rubescens.jpg
| image_caption = The nudibranch Rubramoena rubescens, Gulen Dive Centre, Norway.
| regnum = Animalia
| phylum = Mollusca
| classis = Gastropoda
| unranked_superfamilia = clade Heterobranchia
clade Euthyneura
clade Nudipleura
clade Nudibranchia
clade Dexiarchia 
clade Cladobranchia
clade Aeolidida
| superfamilia = Fionoidea
| familia = Fionidae
| genus = Rubramoena
| species = C. rubescens
| binomial = Rubramoena rubescens
| binomial_authority = Picton & Brown, 1978
| synonyms = Cuthona rubescens (Picton & Brown, 1978)
}}Rubramoena rubescens is a species of sea slug, an aeolid nudibranch, a marine gastropod mollusk in the family Fionidae.

Distribution
This species was described from St. John's Point, Dunkineely, Co Donegal, Ireland. It has been reported from the NE Atlantic from Norway south to Cornwall.

 Description 
The typical adult size of this species is 12–15 mm. It is very similar to Rubramoena amoena, apart from differences in the colour pattern.

 Habitat Cuthona rubescens feeds on hydroids of the genus Halecium especially Halecium halecinum''.

References 

Tergipedidae
Gastropods described in 1978